= 6 Journey =

- Directed by: Basheer Aluri
- Written by: Basheer Aluri
- Produced by: Palayam Ravi Prakash Reddy
- Starring: Sameer Datta; Pallavi Rathod; Palayam Ravi Prakash Reddy; Ramya Reddy; Tasty Teja; Sanjay Acharya; Borra Abhiram; Sahithi Chilla
- Cinematography: T Surendra Reddy
- Edited by: Narapinni Srinubabu
- Release date: May 9, 2025
- Running time: 131 minutes
- Country: India
- Language: Telugu

6 Journey is a 2025 Telugu language film directed by Basheer Aluri, and produced by Palayam Ravi Prakash Reddy.

== Plot ==
In South India, a psychiatrist discovers six young people planning to end their lives after facing fraud. He suggests a final trip to Goa, pretending to join them. But their journey turns deadly when they are caught by a mafia using mobile radiation as a weapon. Trapped in a forest with kidnapped scientists, the group must fight to survive - and rediscover a reason to live.

== Cast ==
- Sameer Datta
- Pallavi Rathod
- Palayam Ravi Prakash Reddy
- Ramya Reddy
- Tasty Teja
- Sanjay Acharya
- Borra Abhiram
- Sahithi Chilla
